The House banking scandal broke in early 1992, when it was revealed that the US House of Representatives allowed its members to overdraw their House checking accounts without the risk of being penalized by the House bank, which was actually a clearinghouse.

The scandal also sometimes known as Rubbergate (from the expressions "rubber check" (bounced check) and "Watergate)," but the term is misleading because House checks did not bounce but were honored because the House Bank provided overdraft protection to its account holders, and the Office of the Sergeant at Arms covered the House Bank with no penalties.

It is also sometimes known as the "check-kiting scandal."

Description 
The House banking scandal ultimately involved more than 450 representatives, most of whom did not break any laws. However, 22 members of Congress were singled out by the House Ethics Committee for leaving their checking accounts overdrawn for at least eight months out of a sample of 39 months:

Four ex-representatives, one delegate, and the former House Sergeant at Arms were convicted of wrongdoing as a result of the investigation that followed.

Among them, former Representative Buz Lukens (R-OH) was convicted on bribery and conspiracy charges. Former Representative Carl C. Perkins (D-KY) pleaded guilty to various charges including a check kiting scheme involving several financial institutions including the House Bank. Former Representative Carroll Hubbard (D-KY) pleaded guilty to three felonies. The former Sergeant at Arms, Jack Russ, pleaded guilty to three felonies.

 

Many US banks, like the House Bank, offered overdraft protection to checking account holders. However, the overdrafts in a regular bank's overdraft protection program are always secured by a line of credit with the bank extended under standard lending protocols, including interest charges, if any, linkage of the protected checking account to another account with the necessary funds to pay the overdraft, such as a savings account; or charges made to a credit card held by the depositor.

The credit unions existed long before the scandal. However, the Office of the House Sergeant-at-Arms had offered a much more-convenient clearing house for Members of Congress' checks, and overdraft protection was managed in a much more lenient (and less expensive) manner than that by the credit unions or, for that matter, any chartered bank.

Public exposure 
In the early days of the scandal, when the media began reporting on the loose practices, Republican Minority Whip Newt Gingrich, along with seven freshman Republicans referred to as the Gang of Seven, or "The Young Turks," made the strategic decision to publicize the scandal in an attempt to sweep representatives with overdrawn accounts, most of whom were Democrats, out of power, although Gingrich himself had 22 overdrawn checks, one being a $9,463 check to the Internal Revenue Service. Jim Nussle, one of the Gang of Seven, came to national attention when he made a speech from the well of the House while he wore a paper bag over his head to protest the "shameful" ethical behavior involved in the scandal.

Gingrich pressured the Speaker of the House, Tom Foley, to ensure that the special counsel appointed to investigate the matter informed the voting public of the overdrafts and the identities of all of the representatives who were responsible.

Aftermath
Anger at the House banking scandal led Congress to create the Joint Committee on the Organization of Congress, a special joint House-Senate tasked with recommending reforms to the Legislative Branch. Resolutions to create the Joint Committee were introduced in summer 1991, but they did not gain traction until after the scandal. Congress created the Joint Committee in August 1992.

The scandal contributed to a perception of corruption and malfeasance and was a contributing factor to major changes in the House in which 77 Representatives resigned or were ousted by the 1994 elections.

References

External links
House Banking Scandal  CongressionalBadBoys.com. List of the 22 worst, as identified by the House Ethics Committee

1992 in American politics
Congressional scandals
Political corruption scandals in the United States